Al-Zughbah  is a Syrian village located in the Hamraa Subdistrict of the Hama District in Hama Governorate. According to the Syria Central Bureau of Statistics (CBS), al-Zughbah had a population of 758 in the 2004 census. Its inhabitants are predominantly Alawites.

References 

Alawite communities in Syria
Populated places in Hama District